Isaac James Latterell (born March 13, 1981) is an American politician and a former Republican member of the South Dakota House of Representatives who has represented District 6 from January 11, 2013 to January 12, 2021. In 2016, he was elected as Majority Whip and served in that position for 2017 and 2018.

Education
Latterell earned his BA in finance from Northern State University.

Elections
 2012 Redistricted to District 6, and with incumbent Republican Representatives Brock Greenfield and Burt Tulson both redistricted to District 2, Latterell ran in the four-way June 5, 2012 Republican Primary and placed first with 808 votes (35.27%); in the four-way November 6, 2012 General election, fellow Republican nominee Herman Otten took the first seat and Latterell took the second seat with 5,000 votes (31.61%) ahead of Democratic nominees Joseph Weis and Michael Jauron.
 2010 To challenge District 3 incumbent Democratic Representative Dennis Feickert, Latterell ran in the June 8, 2010 Republican Primary but again lost the four-way November 2, 2010 General election to incumbent Representatives Novstrup and Feickert, who took the first and second seats respectively.
 2008 When House District 3 incumbent Republican Representative Al Novstrup ran for South Dakota Senate and left a House District 3 seat open, Latterell ran in the June 3, 2008 Republican Primary but lost the four-way November 4, 2008 General election to incumbent Republican Representative David Novstrup, who took the first seat, and Democratic nominee Dennis Feickert, who took the second seat.
 2006 Latterell challenged Senate District 3 incumbent Republican Senator Duane Sutton in the June 6, 2006 Republican Primary, and won by 17 votes with 613 votes (50.7%), but lost the November 7, 2006 General election to Democratic nominee Alan Hoerth.

Political positions
In February 2015, Latterell on his website criticised the practice of beheading unborn children and compared Planned Parenthood to the Islamic State of Iraq and the Levant.

References

External links
 Official page at the South Dakota Legislature
 Campaign site
 

Place of birth missing (living people)
Living people
Republican Party members of the South Dakota House of Representatives
Northern State University alumni
People from Sioux Falls, South Dakota
1981 births
21st-century American politicians